Harper McCaskill (also Whitley) is a fictional character on the New Zealand soap opera Shortland Street portrayed by Ria Vandervis. She made her first screen appearance on the 1 May 2013. She was introduced as close friend to established character, Sarah Potts (Amanda Billing), who had returned after working in New York. Her storylines have focused on her relationships including her lesbian fling with Nicole Miller (Sally Martin) and the most notable being her love triangle with characters Boyd Rolleston (Sam Bunkall) and Drew McCaskill (Ben Barrington). Her most recent storylines have seen her suffer from Addison's Disease, and try to battle for Billie's custody after separating from Drew McCaskill, but was later put on hold as she was discovered to have an aggressive brain tumour that need to be removed.

Creation and casting 
To mark the show's 21st anniversary, 4 new young characters were introduced in an attempt to revamp the show, with the characters of Harper, Dayna Jenkins (Lucy Elliott), Dallas Adams (Cameron Jones) being created alongside the return of Henry Lee (Peter Huang) in a more prominent role. Ria Vandervis was cast as new emergency department Doctor, Harper Whitley. Vandervis was originally hired under a 6-month recurring contract that was later extended to a regular role. Vandervis originally commuted between Dunedin and Auckland for filming. She struggled with the extension due to personal relationship issues and considered quitting the show. Like Vandervis herself, Harper is described as "straight talking", "ambiguous" and "mysterious". She was introduced as friend from medical school to existing character Sarah Potts (Amanda Billing). The character had left New Zealand to pursue her career in Australia and then ended up in New York. At first people are suspicious of why she had returned to New Zealand and is described to be "vague" on the subject. Vandervis commented in an interview with the Otago Daily Times; ''She's an alpha female and uber confident and used to getting what she wants, which causes conflicts, ''She's also hiding a secret and doesn't want that to come up.'' When Vandervis first joined the cast she found it demanding commenting; ''It was terrifying. You get chucked in the deep end. We shoot an episode a day, so you've got 20 minutes to do a scene. You just try try get your words right and hit the mark. You're a little cog in a big machine.''

Storylines 
Harper arrived at Shortland Street shortly after returning from a mysterious past in New York, supposedly to visit best friend Sarah (Amanda Billing). However the two were at odds when she took Sarah's job at the hospital and began to date her ex-husband TK Samuels (Benjamin Mitchell). It later turned out Harper had fled a high up criminal family in America that she was set to marry into. When her fiancé arrived, she briefly considered running away with him but decided to stay in New Zealand. Harper soon discovered she was in love with TK despite his reconciliation with Sarah but shocked all when she began to date Nicole (Sally Martin). The relationship was short-lived and Harper was devastated when Sarah died leading her to seek comfort with TK again, entering into a temporary relationship. However, advances from sensitive doctor Boyd Rolleston (Sam Bunkall) lead to a new more measured romance. Strains became apparent in the steadiness of the relationship however and after investing in a motorbike, Harper met rugged new doctor Drew McCaskill (Ben Barrington) and despite being engaged to Boyd, Harper left him after Drew was shot.

Taking on more responsibility at the hospital through management positions, Harper moved in with Drew. Harper continues an unsteady relationship with Drew. Ashley, her cousin arrives in Ferndale after her mother dies and Harper becomes her legal guardian. She later marries Drew, but Ashley dies after hitting the back of her head on the back of a seat whilst in an argument with a tearaway named Olive.

Harper reveals to Drew that she terminated a pregnancy to him, much to Drew's dismay, he then goes and has sex with friend and colleague Kylie Warner (Kerry-Lee Dewing) after she learns that her husband is a bigamist. However, after they reconciled and Harper was pregnant again, Drew took more responsibility, offering to take a year off work to be a stay-at-home dad, however, because Harper's initial insistence on home birth, she played a prank on him within an hour before actually giving birth. On August 8, Billy was born. The baby is an intersex child. She also named Nicole Miller as the godmother, while Boyd Rolleston, who delivered the baby was named as the godfather by Drew McCaskill, who missed the delivery as he was still reeling over her faking childbirth less than an hour ago.

In October, she separated from Drew after he 'selfishly' gave up a liver to save Damo Johnson's life, and suffer from Addison's Disease. On October 23–24, however, her seizures and dizzy spell become more frequent and severe, leading to a brain tumour diagnosis. Despite it being benign, and her initially opting for chemotherapy, her seizure and collapse got so bad that it needed immediate surgical removal.

Harper's relationship continued to dwindle after Drew was sent to prison for tax evasion, invaded her hobby of boxing, and asserted Billy's 'real' gender. Everything came to a head when, after claiming Leanne's lost lottery ticket for $4 million, Drew admitted that he knew and didn't return the money. He had also lied about a major loan for the IV Bar that was already collapsing due to health code violations. Harper finally decided that enough was enough and broke things off with Drew, only to agree to couples counselling the next episode.

Reception 
After only been on the show for 18 months, the character of Harper had been proven popular in such a short amount of time. The character especially won the attention of viewers when a storyline aired that saw her fall in love with, bisexual character, Nicole, with Harper having had no previous lesbian relationships. This was followed with a 'saucy' photoshoot for a women's magazine and attracted attention with plenty of tweets from followers. One fan reportedly named her daughter 'Harper Ria' in honour of Vandervis and her character and the new-to-acting Vandervis stating she gets stopped for autographs and photos.

References 

Shortland Street characters
Television characters introduced in 2013
Fictional physicians
Fictional female doctors
Female characters in television